Banco Bicentenario is a bank based in Caracas. It was created in late 2009 through the merger with the existing state-owned bank Banfoandes, the banks Bolívar, Central and Confederado and after BaNorte Bank, nationalised as a result of the 2009 banking crisis. The new bank holds around 20% of Venezuelan bank deposits.

See also

 Venezuelan banking crisis of 1994
 http://www.bicentenariobu.com.ve/

References 

2. Banco Bicentenario has funded 220,000 rewarding projects in three decades.

Bicentenario
Government-owned companies of Venezuela
Banks established in 2009
Venezuelan companies established in 2009